Huxi Township (Pha̍k-fa-sṳ: Fù-sî-hiông) is a rural township in Penghu County (the Pescadores), Taiwan. It is located on the eastern part of the Penghu Main Island and is the largest township in Penghu County.

History
Huxi Township was administered as  during the Japanese era. From 1920 to 1926, the village was under Hōko District, Takao Prefecture.

Geography

Huxi Township includes ten minor islands. There are many villages in the township. Among them, Guoye village is famous for its sunrise since it is at the most eastern corner of Penghu main island. Beiliao village is considered as a beautiful place with both sea views and a hill.

Politics and government

Administrative divisions
Huxi Township is divided into 22 rural villages:
Aimen
Baikeng
Beiliao
Chengbei
Chenggong
Dingwan
Dongshi/Dongshih
Guoye
Hongluo
Hudong
Huxi
Jianshan
Lintou
Longmen
Nanliao
Qingluo
Shagang
Xixi
Taiwu
Tanbian
Xujia
Zhongxi

Mayors
Appointed mayors
 Kao Chen-Kun 
Elected mayors
 Kao Chen-Kun 
 Chen Chien 
 Wu Tan-Shih 
 Hsu Shih-Liu 
 Chen Tung-Chen 
 Li Chun-Chi 
 Wu Ming-Hao 
 Hung Fu-Chih 
 Chen Chen-Chung
 Cheng-Chieh Wu

Infrastructure
 Chenggong Reservoir
 Chienshan Power Plant

Tourist attractions
 Qingluo Wetland
 Water Activities at Aimen Beach

Transportation
 Longmen Jianshan Pier

Notable natives
 Chen Kuang-fu, Magistrate of Penghu County (2014–2018)
 Chen Kuei-miao, Acting Mayor of Tainan (1985)

References

External links

 

Townships in Penghu County